This is a comprehensive list of victories of the  cycling team.

1998  home–Jack & Jones

Stage 2 Étoile de Bessèges, Christian Andersen
Omloop Vlaamse Ardennen, Jesper Skibby
Latvian Road Racing Championship, Juris Silovs
Stage 4, Tour de Wallonie, Mikael Kyneb
Stage 4A, Danmark Rundt, Michael Steen Nielsen
Schaal Schels Merksem, Danny Nelissen
Stage 3, Hessen Rundfahrt, Danny Nelissen
Stage 5A, Hessen Rundfahrt, Arvis Piziks
Stage 3, Vic Health Vic Health Herald Sun Tour, Arvis Piziks

1999  home–Jack & Jones

  Stage 1 Tour Down Under, Nicolaj-Bo Larsen
  Rund um den Flughafen Köln-Bonn, Michael Steen Nielsen
  Stage 5, Four Days of Dunkirk, Michael Sandstød
  Four Days of Dunkirk, Michael Sandstød
  GP Midtbank, Michael Sandstød
  Fyn Rundt, Nicolaj-Bo Larsen
 Stage 5, Tour de Luxembourg, Jesper Skibby
  Stage 3, Postgirot Open, Jesper Skibby
  Stage 4, Postgirot Open, Nicolaj-Bo Larsen
   Individual Time Trial Championship, Michael Sandstød
   Road Racing Championship, Nicolaj-Bo Larsen
  Prologue, DEKRA Open, Michael Blaudzun
  Prologue, Tour de la Region Wallonne,  Marc Streel
  Circuito de Gexto, Jesper Skibby
  Stage 1, Tour de la Region Wallonne, Mikael Kyneb
  Stage 4B, Tour de la Region Wallonne Marc Streel
  Tour de la Region Wallonne, Mikael Kyneb
  Stage 5, Danmark Rundt, Michael Steen Nielsen
  Grote Prijs Jef Scherens, Marc Streel
  Zomergem-Adinderke, Marc Streel
   Individual Time Trial Championship, Marc Streel
  Overall Vic Health Herald Sun Tour Michael Blaudzun
  Stage 2 & 10 Nicolaj-Bo Larsen
  Stage 9 Christian Andersen
  Stage 10 Nicolaj-Bo Larsen
  Stage 13 Michael Blaudzun

2000  Memory Card–Jack & Jones

  Stage 4, Paris–Nice, Bo Hamburger
  A Travers la Belgique, Tristan Hoffman
  Overall Four Days of Dunkirk Martin Rittsel
  Stage 1 Four Days of DunkirkArvis Piziks
  Overall Tour de l'Oise,  Michael Sandstød
  Stage 2 & 4 Tour de l'Oise, Michael Sandstød
   GP Midtbank, Michael Sandstød
   Samsung Mobile GP, Arvis Piziks
   Stage 4 Postgirot Open, Nicolaj-Bo Larsen
   Individual Time Trial Championship, Michael Sandstød
   Road Racing Championship, Bo Hamburger
   Road Racing Championship, Arvis Piziks
  Stage 4 Rheinland-Pfalz Rundfahrt, Bo Hamburger

2001 CSC–Tiscali

  Grand Prix d'Ouverture La Marseillaise, Jakob Piil
  Samsung Mobile GP, Michael Sandstød
  Overall Peace Race, Jakob Piil
  Stages 3 & 7, Jakob Piil
  Overall Tour de Picardie, Olivier Asmaker
  Stage 1, Olivier Asmaker
   Individual Time Trial Championship, Michael Blaudzun
   Road Racing Championship, Jakob Piil
  Stages 4 & 7 2001 Tour de France, Laurent Jalabert
  Clásica de San Sebastián, Laurent Jalabert
  Fyn Rundt, Nicolaj-Bo Larsen
  Overall Hessen Rundfahrt, Michael Blaudzun
  Stage 3, Marcelino García
  Stage 5, Rheinland-Pfalz Rundfahrt, Danny Jonasson

2002  CSC–Tiscali

  Tour du Haut Var, Laurent Jalabert
  Stage 3, Paris–Nice, Laurent Jalabert
  CSC Classic, Laurent Jalabert
  Overall Tour de Picardie, Michael Sandstød
  Stage 1, Michael Sandstød
  Stage 14, Giro d'Italia, Tyler Hamilton
   Individual Time Trial Championship, Michael Sandstød
   Road Racing Championship, Michael Sandstød
  Clásica de San Sebastián,  Laurent Jalabert
  Danmark Rundt, Jakob Piil
  Stage 1, Jakob Piil
  Stage 4, Vuelta Ciclista a Burgos, Michael Rasmussen
  Coppa Ugo Agostoni, Laurent Jalabert
  Stage 2, Tour du Poitou Charentes, Nicolas Jalabert
   Stage 3, Rheinland-Pfalz Rundfahrt, Geert van Bondt
  Paris–Tours, Jakob Piil

2003  Team CSC

  Stage 3, International Tour of Rhodos, Thomas Bruun Eriksen
  Internationale Niedersachsen-Rundfahrt, Nicolas Jalabert
  Liège–Bastogne–Liège, Tyler Hamilton
  CSC Classic, Jakob Piil
  Overall Tour de Romandie, Tyler Hamilton
  Stage 5, Tyler Hamilton
  Stage 2 Four Days of Dunkirk, Lars Michaelsen
  Stage 5 Peace Race, Thomas Bruun Eriksen
  Wachovia Cycling Series – Lancaster, Jakob Piil
Wachovia Cycling Series – Trenton, Julian Dean
   Individual Time Trial Championship, Michael Blaudzun
   Road Racing Championship, Nicki Sørensen
  Stage 10, 2003 Tour de France, Jakob Piil
  Stage 13, 2003 Tour de France, Carlos Sastre
 Stage 16, 2003 Tour de France,  Tyler Hamilton
  Tour de Wallonie 2.3, Julian Dean
  Stages 4 & 5, Julian Dean
  Stage 2, Internationale Hessen-Rundfahrt, Lars Michaelsen
  Stage 2, Circuit Franco-Belge, Julian Dean
  Firenze-Pistoria, Andrea Peron

2004  Team CSC

  Overall Tour de Méditeranéen, Jörg Jaksche
  Stage 5, Jörg Jaksche
  Overall Paris–Nice, Jörg Jaksche
  Stage 1, Jörg Jaksche
  Critérium International, Jens Voigt
  Stages 2 & 3Jens Voigt
  Stage 5a, Tour of the Basque Country, Jens Voigt
  Stage 5b, Tour of the Basque Country, Bobby Julich
  GP S.A.T.S., Frank Høj
  CSC Classic, Kurt Asle Arvesen
  Bayern Rundfahrt, Jens Voigt
   Individual Time Trial Championship, Michael Sandstød
   Road Racing Championship, Michael Blaudzun
  Stage 12, 2004 Tour de France, Ivan Basso
  Stage 2, Tour de Wallonie, Fabrizio Guidi
  LuK Challenge - Bühl, Bobby Julich and Jens Voigt
  Overall Danmark Rundt, Kurt Asle Arvesen
  Stage 2, Fabrizio Guidi
  Stage 4, Jens Voigt
  Giro dell'Emilia, Ivan Basso

2005  Team CSC

  GP Ouverture la Marseillaise, Nicki Sørensen
  Overall Tour of Qatar, Lars Michaelsen
  Stage 3, Lars Michaelsen
  Stage 3, Étoile de Bességes, Jens Voigt
  Overall Tour Méditeranéen, Jens Voigt
  Stages 1 & 3, Tour Méditeranéen, Jens Voigt
  Stage 4 (TTT)
  Overall Critérium International, Bobby Julich
  Stage 3, Bobby Julich
  Stage 4, Tour de Georgia, Brian Vandborg
  GP Herning, Michael Blaudzun
  Stage 4 Bayern Rundfahrt, Jens Voigt
   Individual Time Trial Championship, Michael Blaudzun
   Individual Time Trial Championship, Andy Schleck
   Individual Time Trial Championship, Vladimir Gusev
   Road Racing Championship, Lars Bak
   Road Racing Championship, Fränk Schleck
  Stage 4, Sachsen-Tour International, Allan Johansen
  Stage 5, Sachsen-Tour International, Christian Müller
  LuK Challenge Chrono Bühl, Bobby Julich and Jens Voigt
  Overall Danmark Rundt, Ivan Basso
  Stages 1, 2, 3 & 5, Ivan Basso
  Tour de l'Avenir, Lars Bak
  Stage 1, Lars Bak
  Stage 5, Christian Müller
  Paris–Bourges, Lars Bak
  Overall Paris–Nice, Bobby Julich
  Prologue, Jens Voigt
  Stage 5 Tour of the Basque Country, Jens Voigt
  Stages 17 & 18 Giro d'Italia Ivan Basso
  Stage 7 Tour de Suisse, Linus Gerdemann
  Overall Eneco Tour, Bobby Julich
  Stage 7, Bobby Julich 
  Stage 18 Vuelta a España, Nicki Sørensen

2006  Team CSC

  Stage 2 (TTT), Settimana Ciclistica Internazionale
  Overall, Critérium International, Ivan Basso
  Stage 2, Ivan Basso
  Stage 2b, Circuit de la Sarthe, Ivan Basso
  Klasika Primavera, Carlos Sastre
  Stage 1, Tour de Georgia, Lars Michaelsen
  GP Herning, Allan Johansen
  Overall, Tour de Luxembourg, Christian Vande Velde
  Stage 1, Allan Johansen
  Overall, Ster Elektrotoer, Kurt Asle Arvesen
  Stage 4, Ster Elektrotoer, Jens Voigt
   Individual Time Trial Championship, Peter Luttenberger
   Individual Time Trial Championship, Brian Vandborg
   Individual Time Trial Championship, Kurt Asle Arvesen
   Individual Time Trial Championship, Fabian Cancellara
  Stages 3 & 5, Sachsen Tour, Andy Schleck
  Stage 2, Paris–Corrèze, Marcus Ljungqvist
  Overall, Danmark Rundt, Fabian Cancellara
  Stages 2 & 5, Fabian Cancellara
  Rund um die Hainleite, Jens Voigt
  Giro Bochum, Jens Voigt
  Overall, Tour of Britain, Martin Pedersen
  Stage 1, Martin Pedersen
   Time Trial Championship, David Zabriskie
  Stage 2 & 5, 3-Länder-Tour, Karsten Kroon
 Stage 4, 3-Länder-Tour, Luke Roberts
  World Time Trial Championships, Fabian Cancellara
  Prologue Paris–Nice, Bobby Julich
  Stage 5 (ITT) Tirreno–Adriatico, Fabian Cancellara
  Paris–Roubaix, Fabian Cancellara
  Amstel Gold Race, Fränk Schleck
  Overall Giro d'Italia, Ivan Basso
  Stage 5 (TTT) 
  Stages 8, 16 & 20 Giro d'Italia, Ivan Basso
  Stage 1 Volta a Catalunya, Fabian Cancellara
  Eindhoven Team Time Trial, Team CSC
  Stage 13 Tour de France, Jens Voigt
  Stage 15 Tour de France, Fränk Schleck
  Stage 17 Tour de France, Carlos Sastre
  Overall Deutschland Tour, Jens Voigt
  Stages 2, 6 & 7, Jens Voigt
  Stage 1 (TTT) Vuelta a España,

2007  Team CSC

  Stages 2 & 6 Tour of California, Juan José Haedo
  Stage 3 Tour of California, Jens Voigt
  Overall Critérium International, Jens Voigt
  Stage 2, Jens Voigt
  Rund um Köln, Juan José Haedo
  Stage 7, Tour de Georgia, Juan José Haedo
  GP Herning 1.1, Kurt Asle Arvesen
   Individual Time Trial Championship, Fabian Cancellara
  Overall Danmark Rundt, Kurt Asle Arvesen
  Stage 2, Matti Breschel
  Stage 3, Kurt Asle Arvesen
  Stage 2 Tour of Ireland, Matti Breschel
  Stage 3 Tour of Britain, Matthew Goss
  Stage 3 Paris–Nice, Alexandr Kolobnev
  Paris–Roubaix Stuart O'Grady
  Stage 8 2007 Giro d'Italia, Kurt Asle Arvesen
  Stages 1 & 9 2007 Tour de Suisse, Fabian Cancellara
  2007 Eindhoven Team Time Trial
  Prologue & Stage 3 2007 Tour de France, Fabian Cancellara
  Overall 2007 Deutschland Tour, Jens Voigt
  World Time Trial Championships, Fabian Cancellara

2008  Team CSC / CSC–Saxo Bank

  Stages 1 & 5 Tour de San Luis, Juan José Haedo
  Prologue Tour of California, Fabian Cancellara
  Stage 1 Tour of California, Juan José Haedo
   Clásica de Almería, Juan José Haedo
  Stage 3 Vuelta Ciclista a Murcia, Juan José Haedo
  Monte Paschi Eroica, Fabian Cancellara
  Overall Tirreno–Adriatico, Fabian Cancellara
  Stage 5, Fabian Cancellara
  Milan–San Remo, Fabian Cancellara 
  Stage 2 Vuelta a Castilla y León, Karsten Kroon
  E3 Prijs Vlaanderen, Kurt Asle Arvesen
  2008 Critérium International, Jens Voigt
  Stage 2, Tour de Georgia, Juan José Haedo
  Rund um den Henninger Turm, Karsten Kroon
  Stage 18, Giro d'Italia, Jens Voigt
  Prologue, Skoda-Tour de Luxembourg, Fabian Cancellara
  Stage 1, Skoda-Tour de Luxembourg, Juan José Haedo
  Philadelphia International Championship, Matti Breschel
  Stage 1, Ster Elektrotoer, Matti Breschel
   Individual Time Trial Championship, Fabian Cancellara
   Individual Time Trial Championship, Lars Bak
  Road Racing Championship, Nicki Sørensen
   Road Racing Championship, Fränk Schleck
   Road Racing Championship, Kurt Asle Arvesen
  Stage 2, Tour of Austria, Chris Anker Sørensen
   Overall Tour de France, Carlos Sastre
  Stage 11, Kurt Asle Arvesen
  Stage 17, Carlos Sastre
  Stage 5, Sachsen-Tour International, Karsten Kroon
  Stages 2 & 3, Post Danmark Rundt, Matti Breschel
  Stage 5 Post Danmark Rundt Gustav Larsson
  Stage 6, Post Danmark Rundt Juan José Haedo
  Olympic Games Individual Time Trial Championship, Fabian Cancellara
  Stage 2, Tour of Britain, Matthew Goss
  Stage 21, Vuelta a España, Matti Breschel
  Overall Herald Sun Tour, Stuart O'Grady
   Prologue & Stage 1 Herald Sun Tour, Matthew Goss
  Stages 2 & 5, Herald Sun Tour, Stuart O'Grady
  Stage 6 Critérium du Dauphiné Libéré, Chris Anker Sørensen
  Stages 7 & 9 Tour de Suisse, Fabian Cancellara
  Stage 20 Tour de France, Fabian Cancellara
  Overall Tour de Pologne, Jens Voigt
  Stage 6, Jens Voigt

2009  Team Saxo Bank

  Prologue, Tour of California, Fabian Cancellara
  Stage 8, Tour of California, Fränk Schleck
  2009 GP Cholet, Juan José Haedo
  2009 Critérium International, Jens Voigt
  Stage 2, Jens Voigt
  Overall Tour de Luxembourg, Fränk Schleck
  Stage 2, Andy Schleck
  Stage 3, Fränk Schleck
  Stage 4, Matti Breschel
  2009 Tour of Slovenia, Jakob Fuglsang
  Stage 1, Jakob Fuglsang
  Stage 2, Tour de Wallonie, Juan José Haedo
  Stage 3 & 5, Tour de Wallonie, Matthew Goss
   Post Danmark Rundt, Jakob Fuglsang
  Stage 1, Matti Breschel
  Stage 2, Nicki Sørensen
  Stage 3, Jakob Fuglsang
  Overall Tour du Poitou-Charentes, Gustav Larsson
  Stage 3, Gustav Larsson
  Stage 4 Tour of Missouri, Juan José Haedo
  2009 Paris–Brussels, Matthew Goss
  World Time Trial Championships, Fabian Cancellara
  Stage 4 Circuit Franco-Belge, Juan José Haedo
  Japan Cup, Chris Anker Sørensen
  Liège–Bastogne–Liège, Andy Schleck
  Stage 2 Volta a Catalunya, Matti Breschel
  Overall Tour de Suisse, Fabian Cancellara
  Stages 1 & 9, Fabian Cancellara
  Stage 4, Matti Breschel
  Stage 1 Tour de France, Fabian Cancellara
  Stage 12 Tour de France, Nicki Sørensen
  Stage 17 Tour de France, Fränk Schleck
  Stage 5 Eneco Tour, Lars Bak
  Stages 1 & 7 Vuelta a España, Fabian Cancellara

2010  Team Saxo Bank

  Stage 4 Bay Cycling Classic, Baden Cooke
  Berlin Six Days, Alex Rasmussen
  Berlin Six Days, Michael Mørkøv
  København Six Days, Michael Mørkøv
  København Six Days, Alex Rasmussen
  Overall Tour of Oman, Fabian Cancellara
  Tour de Mumbai II, Juan José Haedo
  Stage 4 Vuelta a Andalucía, Alex Rasmussen
  Dwars door Vlaanderen, Matti Breschel
  Stage 4 Volta Ciclista a Catalunya, Jens Voigt
  World Track Championships (Scratch), Alex Rasmussen
  E3 Harelbeke, Fabian Cancellara
  Stage 7 Volta Ciclista a Catalunya, Juan José Haedo
  Ronde van Vlaanderen, Fabian Cancellara
  Paris–Roubaix, Fabian Cancellara
  Stage 3 Tour de Romandie, Richie Porte
  Stage 1 & 3 Four days of Dunkirk, Alex Rasmussen
  Stage 8 Giro d'Italia, Chris Anker Sørensen
  Stage 21 Giro d'Italia,  Gustav-Erik Larsson
   Young rider classification Giro d'Italia,  Richie Porte
   Stage 2 Tour de Luxembourg, Fränk Schleck
   Stage 2 Critérium du Dauphiné, Juan José Haedo
  Overall Tour de Suisse, Fränk Schleck
  Stage 1, Fabian Cancellara
  Stage 3, Fränk Schleck
   National Time Trial Championship, Gustav Larsson
   National Time Trial Championship, Jakob Fuglsang
   National Time Trial Championship, Andy Schleck
   National Time Trial Championship, Jarosław Marycz
   National Road Race Championship, Nicki Sørensen
   National Road Race Championship, Fränk Schleck
  Stage 1 Vuelta Ciclista a la Comunidad de Madrid, Gustav Larsson
   Overall Tour de France, Andy Schleck
   Young rider classification, Andy Schleck
  Prologue Tour de France, Fabian Cancellara
  Stage 8 Tour de France, Andy Schleck
  Stage 17, Andy Schleck
  Stage 19, Fabian Cancellara
  Overall Post Danmark Rundt, Jakob Fuglsang
  Stage 3, Matti Breschel
  Overall Tour du Limousin, Gustav Larsson
  Stage 2, Gustav Larsson
  World Time Trial Championships, Fabian Cancellara
   Amstel Curaçao Race:  Fränk Schleck
   National Track Championships (Madison), Alex Rasmussen
   National Track Championships (Madison), Michael Mørkøv

2011  Saxo Bank–SunGard

  Dwars door Vlaanderen, Nick Nuyens
  Stage 4 Vuelta a Castilla y León, Richie Porte
  Stage 3 Ster ZLM Toer, Juan José Haedo
   Road Racing Championship, Nicki Sørensen
  Stage 5 Danmark Rundt, Richie Porte
  Grand Prix d'Isbergues, Jonas Aaen Jørgensen
  Stage 3, Tirreno–Adriatico, Juan José Haedo
  Tour of Flanders, Nick Nuyens
  Stage 16 Vuelta a España, Juan José Haedo

2012  Team Saxo Bank / Saxo Bank–Tinkoff Bank

  Stages 3 & 5 Tour de San Luis, Alberto Contador
  Stages 4 & 7 Tour de Taiwan, Jonathan Cantwell
  GP de Denain Porte du Hainaut, Juan José Haedo
  G.P. Beghelli, Nicki Sørensen
  Stage 3 Tour de l'Ain, Daniel Navarro
  Milano–Torino, Alberto Contador
   Overall Vuelta a España, Alberto Contador
  Stage 17 Vuelta a España, Alberto Contador

2013  Saxo–Tinkoff

  Stage 6, Tour de San Luis, Alberto Contador
  Amstel Gold Race, Roman Kreuziger
   Road Race Championship, Michael Mørkøv
  Stages 2 & 3, Danmark Rundt, Matti Breschel
  Stage 2 Vuelta a España, Nicolas Roche
  Stage 6 Vuelta a España, Michael Mørkøv
  Japan Cup, Michael Rogers

2014  Tinkoff–Saxo

  Stage 4 Volta ao Algarve, Alberto Contador
   Overall Tirreno–Adriatico, Alberto Contador
  Stages 4 & 5, Alberto Contador
   Overall Tour of the Basque Country, Alberto Contador
  Stage 1, Alberto Contador
  Stages 11 & 20 Giro d'Italia, Michael Rogers
   Overall Tour de Luxembourg, Matti Breschel
  Stages 2 & 3, Matti Breschel
   Overall Route du Sud, Nicolas Roche
  Stage 2, Nicolas Roche
   Road Race Championship, Michael Valgren
 Stage 6 Tour of Austria, Evgeni Petrov
   Mountains classification Tour de France, Rafał Majka
  Stages 14 & 17, Rafał Majka
  Stage 16 Michael Rogers
   Overall Tour de Pologne, Rafał Majka
  Stages 5 & 6, Rafał Majka
   Overall Danmark Rundt, Michael Valgren
  Stage 3, Manuele Boaro
   Overall Vuelta a España, Alberto Contador
   Combination classification, Alberto Contador
  Stages 16 & 20, Alberto Contador

2015  Tinkoff–Saxo

  Stage 3 Vuelta a Andalucía, Alberto Contador
  Stage 3 Circuit de la Sarthe, Manuele Boaro
  Stage 6 Tirreno–Adriatico, Peter Sagan
   Overall Tour of California, Peter Sagan
  Stages 4 & 6 (ITT), Peter Sagan
   Overall Tour of Norway, Jesper Hansen
  Stage 3, Jesper Hansen
   Overall Giro d'Italia, Alberto Contador
 Stages 3 & 6 Tour de Suisse, Peter Sagan
  Overall Route du Sud, Alberto Contador
  Stage 3, Alberto Contador
   National Time Trial Championship, Christopher Juul-Jensen
   National Time Trial Championship, Peter Sagan
   National Road Race Championship, Chris Anker Sørensen
   National Road Race Championship, Peter Sagan
   Points classification Tour de France, Peter Sagan
  Stage 11 Tour de France, Rafał Majka
  Stage 4 Tour de Pologne, Maciej Bodnar
   Overall Danmark Rundt, Christopher Juul-Jensen
  Stages 3 & 4, Matti Breschel
  Stage 6, Michael Mørkøv
  Stage 6 USA Pro Cycling Challenge, Roman Kreuziger
  Stage 3 Vuelta a España, Peter Sagan

2016  Tinkoff

  Stage 2 Tour Down Under, Jay McCarthy
  Stage 1 Vuelta a Andalucía, Daniele Bennati
  Stage 3 Vuelta a Andalucía, Oscar Gatto
  Stage 5 Volta ao Algarve, Alberto Contador
   Points classification Tirreno–Adriatico, Peter Sagan
  Gent–Wevelgem, Peter Sagan
  Tour of Flanders, Peter Sagan
   Overall Tour of the Basque Country, Alberto Contador
  Stage 5 (ITT), Alberto Contador
  Stage 5 (TTT), Tour of Croatia
  Stages 1 & 4 Tour of California, Peter Sagan
  Prologue (ITT) Critérium du Dauphiné, Alberto Contador
  Stages 2 & 3 Tour de Suisse, Peter Sagan
   National Time Trial Championship, Maciej Bodnar
   National Road Race Championship, Rafał Majka
   National Road Race Championship, Juraj Sagan
   Points classification Tour de France, Peter Sagan
   Mountain classification Tour de France, Rafał Majka
  Stages 2, 11 & 16 Tour de France, Peter Sagan
   Overall Danmark Rundt, Michael Valgren
  Stage 3, Michael Valgren
  Grand Prix Cycliste de Québec, Peter Sagan
   Road Race Championship, Peter Sagan
   Points classification Eneco Tour, Peter Sagan
  Stages 3 & 4, Peter Sagan

Supplementary statistics
Sources

Notes

Sources

Team Saxo Bank Official Website (English)
Team CSC Official Website
CykelSupportDanmark, Team CSC's official Danish fan club
Lars Werge, "Drømmeholdet – historien om CSC" (The dream team – the history of CSC), Denmark, 2005, 

Tinkoff (cycling team)
home